Assumpta Oturu (born 1953) is a Ugandan-American journalist and poet. She hosts a weekly radio programme, 'Spotlight Africa', on the Los Angeles-based radio station KPFK. She has published poetry as Assumpta Acam-Oturu.

Life
Acam-Oturu was born in Teso, Eastern Uganda. She obtained a diploma in journalism from Mindolo Ecumenical Centre's School of Journalism in Zambia, and in 1983 earned a BA in Journalism and International Relations from the  University of Southern California. She started 'Spotlight Africa' on KPFK in July 1986, to address the lack of knowledge about Africa amongst Americans. The programme, broadcast weekly on Saturdays, documents African politics, economics, current affairs, social and women's issues.

Oturu appeared in the 2015 documentary Bound: Africans vs African Americans, which explored tensions in the African diaspora. Oturu emphasised the historical roots of these tensions, in the slave trade and African ignorance of the African American experience. At an African Diaspora Conference in November 2017 she emphasised the opportunities for Africans and African Americans to enlighten each other about the specificities of their respective cultures.

Poetry
 'A Fountain of Blood', Ufahamu: A Journal of African Studies, Vol. 16, Issue 1 (1988), p. 136
 'Arise to the Day's Toil' and 'An Agony... A Resurrection', in Stella Chipasula & Frank Mkalawile Chipasula, eds., The Heinemann book of African women's poetry, Heinemann Educational Publishers, 1995.
 'An Agony... A Resurrection', in Tanure Ojaide and Tijan M. Sallah, eds., The New African Anthology, Lynne Reinner Publishers, 1999.

References

External links
 The Resurgence and Redefinition of Pan-Africanism: Assumpta Oturu

1953 births
Living people
People from Teso sub-region
Ugandan poets
Ugandan women poets
Ugandan emigrants to the United States
University of Southern California alumni
Ugandan radio presenters
Ugandan women radio presenters
American radio hosts
American women radio presenters